Roger Gnoan M'Bala (born 1943) is an Ivorian film director.  Born in Grand-Bassam, Ivory Coast, he studied history in Paris and film at the Conservatoire libre du cinéma français (CLCF) and later on in Sweden. From 1968 to 1978, he worked for the Radiodiffusion Télévision ivoirienne (RTI). before creating the 1970 black and white documentary on the traditional dance Koundoum. In 1972 he won the Silver Tanit at the Carthage Film Festival with the short Amanie and several other awards including a FIFEF. Thereafter he produced independently a short, Valisy and a medium-length satirical film, Le Chapeau. In 1984 he directed his first feature film, Ablakon. He became known thanks to his film Au nom du Christ, winning in 1993 a premio giovani at the Locarno International Film Festival and an Étalon de Yennenga at the FESPACO.

Early life
Born in 1943 in Grand Bassam the first capital of Côte d'Ivoire.

Filmography

Shorts
Koundoum (1970)
La Biche (1971)
Amanie (1972)
Gboundo (1974)
Le Chapeau (1975)

Feature film
Ablakon (1984)
Bouka (1988)
Au nom du Christ (1993)
Adanggaman (2000)
Le Peuple Niambwa (2009)
Le Dipri (2009)

References

External links 
 

Ivorian film directors
1943 births
Living people
People from Grand-Bassam